The 2021–22 Lafayette Leopards men's basketball team represented Lafayette College in the 2021–22 NCAA Division I men's basketball season. The Leopards, led by 27th-year head coach Fran O'Hanlon, played their home games at the Kirby Sports Center in Easton, Pennsylvania as members of the Patriot League.

On January 21, O'Hanlon announced that he will retire at the end of the season.

Previous season
In a season limited due to the ongoing COVID-19 pandemic, the Leopards finished the 2020–21 season 9–6, 9–5 in Patriot League play to finish in first place in the Central Division. As the No. 3 seed in the Patriot League tournament, they were upset by Bucknell in the quarterfinals.

Roster

Schedule and results

|-
!colspan=12 style=| Non-conference regular season

|-
!colspan=12 style=| Patriot League regular season

|-
!colspan=9 style=| Patriot League tournament

Sources

References

Lafayette Leopards men's basketball seasons
Lafayette Leopards
Lafayette Leopards men's basketball
Lafayette Leopards men's basketball